Mutur or Muttur is a town in the Trincomalee District of Sri Lanka, located about 25 km south of Trincomalee, on the southern side of Trincomalee Harbour. In Tamil it translates to 'ancient village'. Mutur is mostly accessed by sea route. After 2010, a new seaside road was built to link with Trincomalee town via Kinniya.

See also
 Mutur Electoral District
 2006 Trincomalee massacre of NGO workers

References 

Towns in Trincomalee District
Muttur DS Division